Jungle of the Midwest Sea is the fourth studio album by the Chicago celtic punk band Flatfoot 56. The album was released on May 15, 2007 by Flicker Records. The album received critical acclaim and the band embarked on several tours after the release.  The album was produced by The O.C. Supertones members, Ethan Luck & Daniel Spencer.

Track listing

Awards

The album was nominated for a Dove Award for Rock Album of the Year at the 39th GMA Dove Awards.

References

2007 albums
Flatfoot 56 albums